"For Whom the Bell Tolls" is a song by American heavy metal band Metallica. It was first released on the group's second album, Ride the Lightning (1984).  Elektra Records also released it as a promotional single, with both edited and full-length versions. The song is generally regarded as one of Metallica's most popular; by March 2018, it ranked number five on the band's live performance count. Several live albums and video albums include the song.

Composition
The song was inspired by Ernest Hemingway's 1940 novel of the same name about the process of death in modern warfare and the bloody Spanish Civil War. Specific allusions are made to the scene described in Chapter 27 of the book, in which five soldiers are obliterated during an airstrike after taking a defensive position on a hill.

Cliff Burton plays the bass guitar introduction with heavy distortion and a wah pedal. Burton wrote the intro long before joining Metallica and first played it during a 12-minute jam at a battle of the bands with his second band Agents of Misfortune in 1979.

The bell sound heard at the beginning of the track was actually produced by drummer Lars Ulrich striking an anvil with a metal hammer in combination with a bell from a sound effects reel.

Track listing 
"For Whom the Bell Tolls" was released as a promo single with two versions of the song. An edited version appears on the A-side, with the full-length album version on the B-side.

Other versions
Metallica

In 1999 and 2019, Metallica recorded "For Whom the Bell Tolls" with the San Francisco Symphony for the live albums S&M and S&M2, respectively. Other live versions appear on Cliff 'Em All (VHS, 1987), Live Shit: Binge & Purge (1993), Cunning Stunts (DVD, 1997), Français Pour une Nuit (DVD, 2009), Orgullo, Pasión, y Gloria: Tres Noches en la Ciudad de México (2009), The Big Four: Live from Sofia, Bulgaria (DVD, 2010), Quebec Magnetic (DVD, 2012), and Metallica: Through the Never (soundtrack, 2013).

Mixes
 A remix by DJ Spooky appeared on the Spawn soundtrack, titled "For Whom the Bell Tolls (The Irony of it All)". Metallica later released it on "The Memory Remains" single, re-titled "For Whom the Bell Tolls (Haven't Heard It Yet Mix)". "The Irony of it All" has vocals from both the chorus and verses of the song, while "Haven't Heard It Yet Mix" only has vocals from the chorus.

Personnel
 James Hetfieldvocals, rhythm guitar
 Kirk Hammettlead guitar
 Cliff Burtonbass guitar
 Lars Ulrichdrums, anvil

Charts

In popular culture 

 Beavis and Butt-Head (S4E15, 1994)
 Spawn (1997)
 The song was used in the intro to Zombieland (2009)
 Guitar Hero: Metallica (Video game, 2009)
 WrestelMania XXVII (2011)
 Metallica: Through the Never (2013)

 In the end credits of The Devil's Candy (2015)
 Daddy's Home (2015)
 Triple Frontier (2019)
 Metsäjätti (2020)
 Metal Lords (2022)
The song can be heard on the in-game radio in the hit game Fortnite

Certifications

See also
 List of anti-war songs

References

1984 songs
Metallica songs
Songs written by Cliff Burton
Songs written by James Hetfield
Songs written by Lars Ulrich
Elektra Records singles
Music based on novels
Anti-war songs
Ernest Hemingway